Henry Ralph Nevill (17 June 1821 - 17 October 1900) was Archdeacon of Norfolk from 1874 until his death.

Nevill was educated at Rugby and University College, Oxford. He was ordained in  1848. After a curacy in Great Yarmouth he was Vicar of St Mark, Norwich from 1857 to 1858; and then of Great Yarmouth from 1858 to 1873.

Notes

1821 births
1900 deaths
19th-century English Anglican priests
People educated at Rugby School
Archdeacons of Norfolk
Alumni of University College, Oxford